Domestic Relations is a 1957 short story collection by Frank O'Connor.

Stories
It includes the following stories:

The Genius
The Study of History
The Man of the World
The Duke's Children
Daydreams
Private Property
A Bachelor's Story
The Pariah
Expectation of Life
The Ugly Duckling
Orphans
A Salesman's Romance
Fish for Friday
Pity
The Paragon

References

1957 short story collections
Short story collections by Frank O'Connor
Works by Frank O'Connor
Alfred A. Knopf books
Hamish Hamilton books